Johannes Andreas Rüdiger (1 November 1673 – 6 June 1731) was a German philosopher and physicist.

Main Works 
 1707 Philosophia synthetica
 1709, 1722 De sensu veri et falsi
 1711, 1717, 1718 Institutiones eruditionis (= Institutiones philosophiae systematicae)
 1716 Physica divina
 1717 Obiectiones contra Physicam divinam... cum notis Auctoris Physicae divinae
 1723, 1729 Philosophia pragmatica

References 

 Schepers, Heinrich, Andreas Rüdigers Methodologie und ihre Voraussetzungen. Ein Beitrag zur Geschichte der deutschen Schulphilosophie im 18. Jahrhundert, Köln 1959 (Kantstudien Ergänzungshefte, Bd. 78).
 Suitner, Riccarda, "Jus naturae und natura humana in August Friedrich Müllers handschriftlichem Kommentar zu Andreas Rüdigers Institutiones eruditionis", in: Jahrbuch Aufklärung 25 (2014), special issue "Natur", ed. by Martin Mulsow/Friedrich Vollhardt, pp. 113–132

18th-century German physicists
1673 births
1731 deaths
18th-century German philosophers